The Humbling is a 2014 comedy-drama film directed by Barry Levinson and written by Buck Henry and Michal Zebede, based on the 2009 novel The Humbling by Philip Roth. The film stars Al Pacino, Greta Gerwig, Dianne Wiest, Nina Arianda, Dylan Baker, Charles Grodin, Dan Hedaya, Billy Porter, Kyra Sedgwick, and Mary Louise Wilson.

It was screened in the Special Presentations section of the 2014 Toronto International Film Festival and in the Out of Competition section of the 71st Venice International Film Festival. The film was released on January 23, 2015, by Millennium Films.

Plot
Simon Axler is an aging actor who suffers from bouts of dementia. He is institutionalized after an incident during a Broadway play, then returns home, where he contemplates suicide in Hemingway style. When he embarks upon an affair with an old friend's amoral bisexual daughter, his world starts to fall apart. It ends on stage, with even Axler's audience and fellow actors unsure of what's real and what's not.

Cast
Al Pacino as Simon Axler
Greta Gerwig as Pegeen Mike Stapleford
Kyra Sedgwick as Louise Trenner
Dan Hedaya as Asa Stapleford
Dianne Wiest as Carol Stapleford
Charles Grodin as Jerry
Dylan Baker as Dr. Farr
Nina Arianda as Sybil
Billy Porter as Prince
Mary Louise Wilson as Mrs. Rutledge

Production
After reading and connecting with the book, Pacino decided to option the book and asked Barry Levinson to direct it. Levinson decided to make the movie as a dark comedy, noting, "If you want to talk about an older actor in decline, just to do it as some straight drama didn’t seem that intriguing to me" also citing that comedy "seemed to me inherent in the piece". Although both Pacino and Levinson have denied that the character of Simon is autobiographical to Pacino's life, Pacino noted that he related to the material, stating that "it’s in, as they say, my wheelhouse."

Although the film in the beginning had ample funding, the listed conditions got too much for Levinson, who rejected them and lost by his estimate "somewhere in the area of $6 million." Subsequently it was decided to shoot the film incrementally with several breaks built in to accommodate Pacino's schedule. This was a new experience for Levinson although he welcomed the change of pace as "It added to the clarity."

On February 4, 2014, it was announced that Millennium Films had acquired the worldwide rights to the film.

Reception
The Humbling received mixed reviews from critics. On Rotten Tomatoes, the film has a rating of 53%, based on 64 reviews, with a rating of 5.4/10. The site's critical consensus reads, "The Humbling is an inarguable highlight of Al Pacino's late-period filmography, but that's an admittedly low bar that it doesn't always clear by a very wide margin." On Metacritic, the film has a score of 59 out of 100, based on 25 critics, indicating "mixed or average reviews".

References

External links

Adultery in films
2014 independent films
2014 romantic comedy-drama films
Erotic romance films
2010s erotic drama films
American romantic comedy-drama films
American erotic drama films
Films directed by Barry Levinson
Films with screenplays by Buck Henry
Films about actors
Films scored by Marcelo Zarvos
Films based on works by Philip Roth
Films based on American novels
2014 comedy films
2014 drama films
2010s English-language films
2010s American films